The Oregon Court of Appeals is the state intermediate appellate court in the US state of Oregon. Part of the Oregon Judicial Department, it has thirteen judges and is located in Salem. Except for death penalty cases, which are reserved to the Oregon Supreme Court, and tax court cases, it has jurisdiction to hear all civil and criminal appeals from Oregon circuit courts, and to review actions of most state administrative agencies. The 13 judges of the court are chosen by the people in statewide nonpartisan elections to six-year terms, and have as their administrative head a Chief Judge appointed from their number by the Chief Justice of the state Supreme Court.

Appeals court decisions are subject to a petition by an aggrieved party for review by the Oregon Supreme Court.  The petition must be made within 35 days of the decision, and the Supreme Court determines by vote of the Justices whether to review the case. The court holds session at the Oregon Supreme Court Building in Salem, with offices in the neighboring Justice Building.

History
Established in 1969, the court originally had five seats before expanding to ten seats in 1977. Also in 1977, the court's jurisdiction was expanded to include almost appeals. Prior to the expansion, it could only hear appeals to criminal, domestic relations, and some juvenile matters, as well as reviews of actions by state agencies. The Oregon Legislature has debated adding additional judgeships in both 2011 and 2012. Three seats were added in 2013 to bring the total to thirteen.  The Oregon Court of Appeals is one of the busiest appellate courts in the country, handling between 3,200 and 4,100 cases annually during a recent ten-year period.

Chief judges
Chief Judges from the history of the court.

Current judges
The current thirteen member court.

See also 
 List of Oregon judges

References

External links 
 
 Oregon Rules of Appellate Procedure (2007)
 Oregon Revised Statutes: Chapter 2 – Supreme Court; Courts of Appeals (ORS 2.010, et seq.)

Court of Appeals
State appellate courts of the United States
1969 establishments in Oregon
Courts and tribunals established in 1969